The 2013–14 Hong Kong Fourth Division League is the 3rd season, as well as the 2nd season after the re-introduction, of Hong Kong Fourth Division League, the four-tier football league in Hong Kong organised by the Hong Kong Football Association.

The season will start on 22 September 2013 and is expected to end in late April. Fixtures were announced on 26 August 2013.

Teams

Changes from last season

From Fourth Division League
Promoted to Third Division League
 Yau Tsim Mong
 Mutual
 Kwong Wah
 Sun Source

Eliminated from Hong Kong Football Association league system
 Blake Garden

To Fourth Division League
Relegated from Third Division League
 Fukien

Team review
The 2013–14 season of the Hong Kong Fourth Division League consists of 14 clubs, including 10 clubs from the 2012–13 season, 1 club relegated from 2012–13 Third Division. The Hong Kong Football Association accepts no more than 3 newly registered team, but at last none is registered.

The detail of the clubs is as follows.

League table

Positions by round

Results

Fixtures and results

Round 1

Remark: Week 1 matches are cancelled and postponed due to typhoon. Matches will be rescheduled soon.

Round 2

Round 3

Round 4

Round 5

Round 6

Round 7

Round 8

Round 9

Round 10

Round 11

Round 12

Round 13

Round 14

Round 15

Round 16

Round 17

Round 18

Round 19

Round 20

Round 21

Round 22

References

Hong Kong Fourth Division League seasons
4